Guaraqueçaba Environmental Protection Area is a protected area in the  State of Paraná, Brazil.
It includes Atlantic Forest, mangrove, salt marsh and estuarine environments in an area with a relatively low human population.

Location

It is administered by the Chico Mendes Institute for Biodiversity Conservation.
It covers parts of the municipalities of Antonina, Campina Grande do Sul, Guaraqueçaba and Paranaguá in the State of Paraná.
It includes diverse environments of the Atlantic Forest biome including tropical rain forest, montane forest, mangrove and salt marsh.
The area includes the  Superagui National Park and the Guaraqueçaba Ecological Station.
The coastal area is in the Iguape-Cananéia-Paranaguá estuary lagoon complex.

Conservation

The area is classed as IUCN protected area category V, protected landscape/seascape.
Objectives are to protect biological diversity, manage human impacts and ensure the sustainable use of natural resources. The area was created to protect one of the last representative areas of Atlantic Forest biome as well as the Paranaguá Bay estuarine complex and archaeological sites, to control the use of pesticides, to preserve the caiçaras communities that have become integrated into the regional ecosystem and to establish rational criteria for land use in the region.
The conservation unit is part of the Lagamar mosaic.

Protected species include black-fronted piping guan (Pipile jacutinga), red-tailed amazon (Amazona brasiliensis), white-necked hawk (Buteogallus lacernulatus), black-headed berryeater (Carpornis melanocephala), purple-winged ground dove (Claravis geoffroyi), neon goby (Elacatinus figaro), Superagui lion tamarin (Leontopithecus caissara) and fasciated tiger heron (Tigrisoma fasciatum}.

Notes

Sources

Environmental protection areas of Brazil
Protected areas of Paraná (state)
Protected areas of the Atlantic Forest
1985 establishments in Brazil
Protected areas established in 1985